Bitterscote is an area of Tamworth, Staffordshire that is close to the town centre and contains major retail outlets in a development known as Ventura Park.

Areas of Tamworth, Staffordshire